The 2011 Albany Great Danes football team represented the University at Albany, SUNY as a member of the Northeast Conference (NEC) during the 2011 NCAA Division I FCS football season. Led by 39th-year head coach Bob Ford, the Great Danes compiled an overall record of 8–4 with a mark of 7–1 in conference play, sharing the NEC title with Duquesne. Due to Albany's head-to-head win over Duquesne, the Great Danes earned the conference's automatic bid into the NCAA Division I Football Championship, where they lost in the first round to Stony Brook. The team played home games at University Field in Albany New York.

Schedule

References

Albany
Albany Great Danes football seasons
Northeast Conference football champion seasons
Albany
Albany Great Danes football